Stephanie Ball (born 16 November 2000) is an Australian rugby league footballer who plays as a  for the New Zealand Warriors in the NRL Women's Premiership and Mounties RLFC in the NSWRL Women's Premiership.

Background
Born in Wollongong, Ball played junior rugby league for the Berkeley Eagles before joining the Canterbury-Bankstown Bulldogs.

Playing career
In 2018, Ball played for the Bulldogs' Tarsha Gale Cup team. In 2019, she moved up to the club's NSWRL Women's Premiership team.

2020
On 18 September, Ball was announced as a member of the New Zealand Warriors NRL Women's Premiership squad. In Round 2 of the 2020 NRL Women's season, she made her NRLW debut, coming off the bench in the Warriors' 12–22 loss to the Sydney Roosters.

On 18 October, she won the club's Rookie of the Year award.

Achievements and accolades

Individual
New Zealand Warriors Rookie of the Year: 2020

References

External links
New Zealand Warriors profile

2000 births
Living people
Australian female rugby league players
New Zealand Warriors (NRLW) players
Rugby league players from Wollongong
Rugby league props